Bowes Reed (November 1740 – July 20, 1794) was a Revolutionary officer, politician, and public servant from New Jersey. He was the brother of Joseph Reed, a member of the Continental Congress and President of the Supreme Executive Council of Pennsylvania (equivalent to Governor).

Early life and career
Reed was born in 1740 in Trenton, New Jersey (then part of Hunterdon County) to Andrew Reed, a shopkeeper and merchant, and Theodosia Bowes. In 1767 he was appointed surrogate of Hunterdon County, and he later resided in Burlington. In 1773 he was licensed as an attorney-at-law, but he never became a counsellor.

Revolutionary War
In June 1776, at the beginning of the  Revolution, the Provincial Congress of New Jersey appointed Reed Lieutenant Colonel of the battalion to be raised in Gloucester, Salem, Cumberland and Burlington counties. One of his duties was the guarding of William Franklin, the last Colonial Governor of New Jersey, who had been taken prisoner. In September 1776 he was commissioned Colonel of the First Regiment of Burlington, resigning in March 1778.

Reed served in a number of other capacities during the Revolution. He was appointed Clerk of the Supreme Court of New Jersey in 1776, and he served as a Justice of the Peace of Burlington County from 1777 to 1779. In 1778 he was named Deputy Secretary of State of New Jersey, and later that year, upon the resignation of Charles Pettit (the husband of Reed's sister Sarah), he was elevated to the position of Secretary of State.

Post-war years
Reed continued as Secretary of State after the War, serving until his death in 1794. In 1784, the New Jersey Legislature appointed him Mayor of Burlington, New Jersey. He was reappointed in 1789 and served until his death.

Family
By his first wife, Margaret Johnstone, Reed had four children:
 Maria Reed (born November 11, 1775, married Joseph McIlvaine, United States Senator from New Jersey)
 Charles Pettit Reed (born April 6, 1778)
 Ann Burnet Reed (October 31, 1784 – November 3, 1787)
 Margaret Reed (December 1786 – January 23, 1788)

After his first wife died during childbirth in December 1786, he married Caroline Moore, daughter of Dr. Alexander Moore of Bordentown. Caroline died on November 6, 1789.

Death
Reed died on July 20, 1794 at the age of 53. The executors of his will were his brother-in-law Charles Pettit and his son-in-law Joseph McIlvaine; Joseph Bloomfield, later Governor of New Jersey, was one of the witnesses. Reed is buried in Saint Mary's Episcopal Churchyard in Burlington.

References

1740 births
1794 deaths
Politicians from Trenton, New Jersey
American people of Scotch-Irish descent
Secretaries of State of New Jersey
Mayors of Burlington, New Jersey
Continental Army officers from New Jersey
New Jersey lawyers
People from Burlington, New Jersey
Reed family (Pennsylvania and New Jersey)